Good Morning Beautiful may refer to:
"Good Morning Beautiful" (song), a song by Steve Holy
Good Morning Beautiful (By Divine Right album)
Good Morning Beautiful (Irving album)